Crisilla marioni is a species of minute sea snail, a marine gastropod mollusk or micromollusk in the family Rissoidae.

References

Rissoidae
Gastropods described in 1987